"Hey Baby (Jump Off)" is the second single from the collaborative album Face Off by rapper Bow Wow and R&B singer Omarion. This song samples "Going Back to Cali" by LL Cool J. The song originally featured rapper Lil Wayne, however he was cut from the final version for unspecified reasons. His verse later leaked under the name 'Santa Clause'.

Music video
The video was aired on Wednesday, December 26, 2007, on BET's Access Granted. The video is the conclusion to "Girlfriend".  At the end of the video for "Girlfriend", Bow Wow tells Omarion he was going to take him to the "jump off" spot giving the viewer a hint of the next video.  In the beginning Bow Wow and Omarion are in the Aston Martin on their way to the club.  When they get to the club, Bow Wow and Omarion go into their signature sign rooms.  Bow Wow enters a room with a dog paw, and Omarion enters a room with an O with a crown on it.  At the end of the video both Bow Wow and Omarion are trying to get with two girls when their "girlfriends" from the "Girlfriend" video show up and then they leave.

The video includes a cameo appearance from KPWR("POWER 106")/Los Angeles air personality DJ Felli Fel.

Other media
The duo also performed this song in the Ugly Betty episode "Zero Worship," which aired January 10, 2008.

Release history

Chart positions

References 

2007 songs
2008 singles
Bow Wow (rapper) songs
Omarion songs
Columbia Records singles
Songs written by Bow Wow (rapper)
Songs written by Rick Rubin
Songs written by LL Cool J
Songs written by Omarion
Songs written by Sonyae Elise